The APRA Music Awards of 2020 are the 38th annual series, known as APRA Awards, in 2020. The awards are given in a series of categories in three divisions and in separate ceremonies throughout the year: the APRA Music Awards, Art Music Awards and Screen Music Awards. They are provided by the Australasian Performing Right Association and the Australasian Mechanical Copyright Owners Society, known jointly as APRA AMCOS. In mid-February the associations announced that the previous category, Overseas Recognition Award, would be replaced by Global APRA Music Awards with separate ceremonies at three locations: Los Angeles (26 February 2020) for western North American-based artists, Nashville (1 March) for central and eastern North American-based artists and London (6 March) for European-based artists.

Due to the COVID-19 pandemic, the 2020 APRA Music Awards were not held in the usual live format. The event had been due to take place on 28 April at the International Convention Centre in Sydney, instead they were streamed online for the first time as a virtual event on 25 May with Indigenous rapper, Briggs as host. The format featured presenters, winners and performances of the Song of the Year finalists. The nominees were announced on 7 April, winners for Most Performed International Work and Licensee of the Year were announced on 14 May, and the full list of winners was provided to media outlets on 25 May.

The Art Music Awards are provided by APRA AMCOS in conjunction with the Australian Music Centre (AMC), and in 2020 the ceremony was also a virtual event, held on 8 September, hosted by Zela Margossian, Dr Lou Bennett, Jonathan Biggins. They were presented with several new and redefined categories to "acknowledge the achievements of composers, performers and educators in the genres of contemporary classical music, jazz, improvisation, sound art and experimental music."

The Screen Music Awards are presented jointly by APRA AMCOS and the Australian Guild of Screen Composers (AGSC), to "acknowledge excellence and innovation in the field of screen composition." Winners were announced on 1 December at a virtual ceremony and hosted by Justine Clarke, Claudia Karvan and Meyne Wyatt.

Presenters and performers 

Indigenous rapper, Briggs, hosted the virtual APRA Music Awards of 2020 on 25 May. The musical director, Kate Miller-Heidke, curated the performers:

APRA Music Awards

Breakthrough Songwriter of the Year

Licensee of the Year

Most Performed Alternate Work

Most Performed Australian Work

Most Performed Australian Work Overseas

Most Performed Blues & Roots Work

Most Performed Country Work

Most Performed Dance Work

Most Performed International Work

Most Performed Pop Work

Most Performed Rock Work

Most Performed Urban Work

Song of the Year

Songwriter of the Year

Global APRA Music Awards 

In mid-February 2020 APRA AMCOS announced that the Overseas Recognition Award from the APRA Music Awards would be replaced by Global APRA Music Awards with separate ceremonies in London, Los Angeles and Nashville . At each location awards were presented for Breakthrough Songwriter of the Year, Distinguished Services, Overseas Recognition Award, and Songwriter of the Year. The London-based awards, "recognise APRA AMCOS members living in the UK and Europe." The London ceremony was held on 6 March at Ham Yard Hotel, Soho and hosted by Georgia Mooney. The Los Angeles ceremony was held at the GRAMMY Museum, Clive Davis Theatre on 26 February and hosted by Maya Jupiter to "recognise APRA AMCOS members living on the West Coast of the U.S." On 1 March, the Nashville ceremony, to "recognise APRA AMCOS members living on the East Coast of the U.S.", was hosted by O'Shea and held at Clementine Hall.

Breakthrough Songwriter of the Year

Distinguished Services

Overseas Recognition

Songwriter of the Year

Art Music Awards

Work of the Year: Chamber Music

Work of the Year: Choral

Work of the Year: Dramatic

Work of the Year: Electroacustic/Sound Art

Work of the Year: Jazz

Work of the Year: Large Ensemble

Work of the Year: Notated Composition

Performance of the Year: Jazz / Improvised Music

Performance of the Year: Notated Composition

Award for Excellence in Music Education

Award for Excellence in a Regional Area

Award for Excellence in Experimental Music

Richard Gill Award for Distinguished Services to Australian Music

Luminary Award: Individual (National)

Luminary Award: Organisation (National)

Luminary Award: State & Territory Awards

Screen Music Awards

Feature Film Score of the Year

Best Music for an Advertisement

Best Music for Children's Television

Best Music for a Documentary

Best Music for a Mini-Series or Telemovie

Best Music for a Short Film

Best Music for a Television Series or Serial

Best Original Song Composed for the Screen

Best Soundtrack Album

Best Television Theme

Most Performed Screen Composer – Australia

Most Performed Screen Composer – Overseas

Distinguished Services to the Australian Screen

References

2020 in Australian music
2020 music awards
APRA Awards